In April 1959, severe floods hit the country of Uruguay that were the most severe in the modern history of the country.

Rainfall lasted from March 24 until April 23 and as a consequence the Río Negro suffered an overtopping. Waters passed over the Dam of Rincón del Bonete.

Sources

External links

 pilotoviejo.com Las inundaciones del 59. Las operaciones aéreas.
 Aéro Club del Uruguay, Notas y Eventos / Las inundaciones del '59
 El Batallon de Ingenieros de Combate No. 3, Paso de los Toros, Uruguay
 Testimonio de la Operación Terraplen

1959 in Uruguay
Floods in Uruguay
1959 floods in South America
1959 disasters in Uruguay